Mian Shekar Kesh (also Romanized as Mīān Sehkar Kesh; also known as Mīyānshekar) is a village in Otaqvar Rural District, Otaqvar District, Langarud County, Gilan Province, Iran. At the 2006 census, its population was 122, in 35 families.

References 

Populated places in Langarud County